The New Palace was a royal residence of the Karađorđević dynasty of Serbia and later Kingdom of Yugoslavia. Today it is the seat of the President of Serbia. The palace is located on Andrićev Venac in Belgrade, Serbia, opposite of Stari Dvor (Old Palace).

History 

Plans for a new residence emerged after the assassination of Alexander I Obrenović in 1903 and the demolition of the Old Residence a year later. The new king, Peter I Karadjordjević, resided in the Old Palace, which had never been used as a residence but as a venue for state occasions. Since the Old Palace was unsuitable for the royal family’s permanent living, it seemed only natural to think of constructing a new one.

In the 1850s, additional building was constructed next to Old Residence, to the north, and colloquially called Mali dvor or Mali konak ("Little Palace" or "Little Residence"). When the Obrenović dynasty was restored in 1858, they moved in the residences. As an heir apparent, Prince Michael used the Little Palace. Ruling prince Miloš Obrenović, Michael's father, decided in 1858 to build a new palace for his son, which was built next to the palace's garden, to the south on the location of modern Novi Dvor, which became known as the Dvor sa kulama ("Palace with towers"). Upon ascending to the throne in 1860, Michael decided to use the Old Residence, while part of the state administration was located in the Palace with towers. In order to built the new palace, the Palace with towers had to be demolished first.

The Old Palace, built in 1884, was to form the left wing, while the right wing was to be the residence of the Crown Prince which was to replace the residence of the heir to the throne, Michael Obrenović, built in the mid-1860s. Although Prince Michael’s Romantic palace is generally believed to have been designed by the architect Kosta Šreplović, some sources refer to him as the overseer of finishing works, suggesting that more likely architect-designers were Johann Frenzel and Josif Kasano, the most prominent architects at the Bureau of Building Construction. The construction of this building had already given a hint of the palace complex as a tripartite composition. Prince Michael had, however, never lived in it.

Construction 

The construction of the new royal palace for Crown Prince Alexander, to a design by Stojan Titelbah, a prominent Serbian architect of the early 20th century, was announced by the press in the winter of 1911. It was to be built at the corner of the Kralja Milana and Dobrinjska (today Andrićev Venac) streets. In January, Belgrade city administration sent the regulatory and other plans for the building to the Ministry of Construction for confirmation. The Palace with Towers was demolished from April to mid-June, when the leveling of the lot began. Vasa Tešić was selected as the contractor, and he began transporting the materials on 22 August. The cornerstone was ceremonially laid on 14 September 1911, and consecrated by the Serbian metropolitan Dimitrije.

Titelbah personally supervised the construction, and The New Palace is the only known work he did as an architect of the Ministry of Construction. The facade was erected in 1912, and the communal works were done by 1913. By the late May 1914, the construction works were finished, and the wood joinery installation began on the eve of the Great War. The building suffered substantial damage during the war, especially during the 1915 Austro-Hungarian bombing. Occupational Austro-Hungarian army used the building to host soldiers. The woodworks was completely destroyed as it was used for heating by the soldiers. During the withdrawal, the soldiers damaged the building further in November 1918.

After the war, a thorough rebuilding was needed, not only architectural, but also of waterworks, plumbing, wirings, heating, etc. Reconstruction was conducted under the supervision of a special commission which also oversaw the renovation of the Old Palace. Among the members of the commission, which was in charge of the entire work on the King’s residence and seat of the Office of the Marshal of the Court, were the painter Uroš Predić and the architects of the Ministry of Construction Petar Popović and Momir Korunović. Reconstruction began in 1919 and the major works were finished in the spring of 1921. Works on the interiors began in July 1921, and were finished few days before the royal wedding. The New Palace became the official royal residence on 8 June 1922, when King Alexander I and Queen Maria moved in their new home.

Museum of Prince Paul 

The New Palace was the official royal residence from 8 June 1922 until June 1934, when the royal family moved to the newly built Beli dvor residence in Dedinje and King Alexander assigned the old one to the Royal Museum, subsequently renamed the Museum of Prince Paul. The museum was officially opened on 18 January 1936. The Museum was one of the most important cultural institutions in the kingdom and the contemporaries rated it among the most modern European museums. The essential phenomenological aspect of the Museum of Price Paul was the museum display itself. On the ground floor were exhibited prehistoric, ancient and medieval artifacts; the first floor was assigned for monuments of national culture and 19th-century Yugoslav art; on the second floor was the collection of contemporary European art, in which domestic artists occupied an important place. The New Palace housed the Museum of Prince Paul until 1948, when, under a different system of government, it was assigned a different role.

Presidency of Serbia 
 

After the Second World War, the reconstruction and new use of both palaces served the broader objective of transforming the former royal palace complex into the administrative seat of the republic. To connect the former palace complex with the National Assembly (Parliament) building, the fence was removed, the Palace Guard building torn down and the palace garden turned into a public Pioneers Park. In 1948–53 the New Palace building was restyled and extended to a design by the architect Milan Minić to accommodate the Presidency of the Government of the People’s Republic of Serbia (PRS). It received an assembly hall with a vestibule, the facade opposite the Old Palace was given a completely different front dominated by a two-store colonnade of Ionic columns, while the original frontage lines along Kralja Milana and Andrićev venac streets remained unchanged. Consistent with the alterations, a new access to the east, park-facing side of the building was provided; and the heraldic symbols were replaced with emblems symbolising the new form of government. In decorating the interior, special attention was paid to the addition, which was adorned with works of distinguished Yugoslav painters and sculptors, such as Toma Rosandić, Petar Lubarda, Milo Milunović, Milica Zorić etc. Since 1953 the building of the New Royal Palace has successively housed the highest organs of government of Serbia: the Executive Council of the PRS, the Assembly of the PRS, the Presidency of the Socialist Republic of Serbia and, for the longest period of time, the Office of the President of the Republic of Serbia. Today the New Palace forms part of one of the most valuable heritage areas in the historic core of Belgrade. For its historical, cultural, social, architectural and townscape value it was designated as a cultural property in 1983 (Službeni list grada Beograda no. 4/83).

Architecture

Exterior 

The main problem for Titelbah was the stylistic harmony of the new structure with the three decades old Stari Dvor. Turning to historicism, he designed the garden facade with the elements from the renaissance and baroque. He envisioned the towers with domes, but they were not built. Laid out as an architectural counterpart of the Old Palace, the new royal residence historically supported the earlier concept of a palace complex, highlighting the need for rounding off spatially and symbolically a whole that connoted the very idea of the state. The three store building was designed in the style of academism with elements borrowed mostly from Renaissance and Baroque architecture. The most imposing facade faced the garden, and the corner took the form of a domed tower similar to the solution used for the Old Palace. The horizontal facade division showed a rusticated semi-basement, the ground floor and the first floor integrated into one central composition, and an independently and more unassumingly treated second floor.

The articulation of the main facade was achieved by a central and two end projections, and a curved, centrally positioned entrance porch. In accordance with the purpose of the building, special attention in ornamenting the façades was paid to heraldic symbols. The semicircular pediment above the cornice of the central projecting bay contained the full armorial achievement of the royal house of Karađorđević. The tallest and, consequently, dominant element of the New Palace – the tower capped with a dome tapering into a spire topped by a bronze eagle rising – provided the architectural link between the facades facing Kralja Milana and Andrićev Venac streets. Another important heraldic composition was placed just beneath the dome of the corner tower: two identical, symmetrically placed shields with a cross between four fire-steels, i.e. an element of the coat-of-arms of the Kingdom of Serbia, which subsequently was incorporated into the coat-of-arms of the Kingdom of Yugoslavia. The central motif of the façade facing Andrićev Venac was the curved projecting bay whose attic was surmounted by a monumental ornamental composition featuring the coat-of-arms in the centre.

An integral part of the palace complex and the element that related the old and the new palaces to one another was the fence with gates and sentry boxes, which separated the royal palaces and gardens from Kralja Milana Street. A similar role was played by the Palace Guard building whose enlargement and facade remodeling in 1919/20 was carried out by the architect Momir Korunović in such a way as to ensure consistency to the complex in style and layout. The gates in the form of triumphal arches with relief ornamentation and heraldic symbols, the Palace Guard building with two curved wings, and the parterre-type royal gardens with a fountain between the two palaces, gave the complex a formal and stately appearance.

Interior 

In 1911, King Peter I personally ordered to interior design from the German husband and wife designers August and Elsa Bosse, from Weimar. After working on it for two years, they compiled the two-volume album with 50 aquarelles, 65 drawings and 6 large blueprints. The Bosses were in constant contact with the king, who endorsed the designs and paid for it. The album was to be sent to Serbia in the summer of 1914, but the World War I broke out. It is not known why the king didn't ask for the album after the war, but he was already too ill and died before the mansion was fully finished.

The ground floor contained a reception hall, a dining room and, in the portion looking on Kralja Milana Street, a suite for the accommodation of state guests, while the two upper floors were intended as the royal family’s private quarters. As the blueprints did not set aside a space for a kitchen, the kitchen was housed in an adjacent Šumadija-type house connected with the semi-basement of the palace by a tunnel. 

All of the interior decoration, including the sumptuous furniture, was done by the French firm Bézier, which was selected by the crown prince Alexander. Instead of the plain, German style, quite the opposite, exuberant style was applied. Special attention was paid to the interior design of the vestibule, the reception hall, the dining room, the Bosnian Room, the Japanese and English saloons and the private suites of the King and Queen.

Gallery

References

External links
 Institute for Protection of Cultural Monuments, Belgrade heritage
 Politika online
 Andrićev venac: Royal Palace for the President of Serbia

Buildings and structures in Belgrade
Palaces in Serbia
Royal residences in Serbia
Legislative buildings
Houses completed in 1922
Architecture in Serbia
Presidential residences